Kenya will compete at the 2009 World Championships in Athletics from 15–23 August. A team of 43 athletes was announced in preparation for the competition. Selected athletes have achieved one of the competition's qualifying standards. The Kenyan team, characteristically strong in the middle- and long-distance running events, includes reigning world champions Alfred Yego and Janeth Jepkosgei, and reigning Olympic champions Pamela Jelimo, Nancy Jebet Lagat, and Brimin Kipruto.

Team selection
Track and road events

Results

Men
Track and road events

Women
Track and road events

References
General
Provisional 2009 World Championships entry list. IAAF. Retrieved on 2009-08-14.

External links
Official competition website
Ready when it counts most - Yego knows when to come good – article from IAAF

Nations at the 2009 World Championships in Athletics
World Championships in Athletics
Kenya at the World Championships in Athletics